The  is a Japanese wire-guided anti-tank missile developed during the late 1950s. The missile is a broadly similar to the Swiss/German Cobra and the 9M14 Malyutka. Within the JGSDF, it is also known as 64MAT and KAM-3.

History
Development of the missile began in 1957, and was adopted as standard equipment for the Japanese Ground Self-Defense Forces with the official designation Type 64 ATM in 1964. Kawasaki Heavy Industries had been responsible for manufacturing the Type 64.

Though the Type 64 MAT had been largely phased out and replaced by the Type 79 Jyu-MAT and Type 87 Chu-MAT as front-line anti-tank missiles in the 1970s to the 1990s, a small number are being held as reserve missiles.

Description

The missile is cruciform in cross-section with four large wings. It is powered by a dual thrust rocket motor, which accelerates the missile to its cruising speed in 0.8 seconds.

Operational use
The missile is launched from an open framed launcher at an angle of 15 degrees. The operator steers the missile using a control box, which sends commands down a wire that is trailed from the missile. A gyroscope in the missile compensates for pitch and yaw.

The Type 64 is typically operated by a three-man crew. It can also be deployed from a Mitsubishi Type 73 Jeep, which can carry four missiles and a Type 60 Armoured Personnel Carrier.

Similar missile systems
 9M14 Malyutka
 Cobra

See also
 Type 79 Jyu-MAT
 Type 87 Chu-MAT
 Type 01 LMAT

References

  Kenkyusha's New Japanese-English Dictionary, Kenkyusha Limited, Tokyo 1991,

Biography
 Brassey's Infantry Weapons of the World, J.I.H. Owen.
 Jane's Infantry Weapons 1991-92, Ian V. Hogg.
 Brassey's Anti-tank weapons, John Norris

Anti-tank guided missiles of the Cold War
Anti-tank guided missiles of Japan
Cold War weapons of Japan
Military equipment introduced in the 1960s